Air Supply is a British-Australian soft rock duo formed in Melbourne in 1975. They have released 17 studio albums, 13 compilation albums, 4 live albums and 27 singles.

Albums

Studio albums

Live albums

Compilation albums

Video albums

Singles

1976-1983

1984-2015

Music videos

See also

References

External links
Air Supply archived from the original on 22 October 2013 at Australian Rock Database. Retrieved 2 March 2014

Albums by Air Supply at Rate Your Music

Discography
Pop music group discographies
Rock music group discographies
Discographies of Australian artists